Tetreuaresta timida is a species of tephritid or fruit flies in the genus Tetreuaresta of the family Tephritidae.

Distribution
Mexico, Costa Rica.

References

Tephritinae
Insects described in 1862
Diptera of North America